Schwarza is a river of Thuringia, Germany. It flows into the Hasel in Rohr. In its uppermost course it is called Haselbach, in its middle course Schönau.

See also
List of rivers of Thuringia

References

Rivers of Thuringia
Rivers of Germany